is a Japanese kickboxer, currently competing in the super bantamweight division of RISE.

As of August 2022 he was the #10 ranked strawweight kickboxer in the world by Combat Press.

Kickboxing career

Shooto
Arii made his professional debut against Yuki Hamada at RISE WORLD SERIES 2019 Semi Final Round on July 21, 2019. He won the fight by unanimous decision. Arii next faced Lehe at ONE Warrior Series 8 on October 5, 2019. He won the fight by a third-round technical knockout, due to doctor stoppage. Arii faced the unbeaten Ryoga Terayama in his third and final fight of the year at Stand up vol.1 on December 22, 2019. The fight was ruled a unanimous decision draw, with scores of 29–29 across the board.

Arii faced Tatsuma Kinosada at Shooto 2020 Vol.4 in Osaka on July 12, 2020. He won the fight by unanimous decision. Arii made his second appearance at a Road To ONE event two months later, as he was booked to face Naoya Kuroda at ROAD to ONE 3rd: Tokyo Fight Night on October 9, 2020. He won the fight by a second-round knockout, stopping Kuroda with a well placed knee to the body.

Arii returned to RISE in order to face Ryoga Terayama at RISE Dead or Alive Osaka on November 1, 2020. He won the rematch by majority decision, with two scorecards of 30–29 and one scorecard of 29–29. Arii faced Yu Hiramatsu at ROAD to ONE 4th: Young Guns on February 22, 2021. He won the fight by a second-round knockout, as the referee opted to stop the bout following the third knockdown.

Arii participated in the 2021 Cage Kick Championship tournament, held at Shooto 2021 Vol.4 on July 4, 2021. He was able to beat Ryunosuke Omori and Takuro by unanimous decision, in the quarterfinals and semifinals respectively, but came up short against Ryoga Terayama in the finals. Although the pair fought to a draw after three rounds in their trilogy match, Terayama was awarded a split decision following the extra fourth round.

RISE
Arii made his third RISE appearance against Kyosuke at RISE WORLD SERIES 2021 Yokohama on September 23, 2021. He won the fight by unanimous decision. Two of the judges scored the fight 30–28 in his favor, while the third judge scored the fight 30–29 for him.

Arii faced Hyuga at RISE 162 on October 30, 2022, following an thirteen-month absence from the sport. He won the fight by unanimous decision, with all three judges awarding him every single round of the bout.

Arii faced Koyata Yamada at RISE WORLD SERIES / SHOOTBOXING-KINGS on December 25, 2022. He lost the fight by knockout, as he was floored with a counter right straight at the 1:21 minute mark of the second round.

Titles and accomplishments

Professional
Shooto
 2021 Shooto Cage Kick Championship -54kg Runner-up

Amateur
Shin Karate
2016 Dageki Kakutougi Japan Cup K-3 Champion
2017 Shin Karate All Japan K-3 Grand Prix Champion
2018 Shin Karate All Japan K-3 Grand Prix Champion
2018 Dageki Kakutougi Japan Cup -58kg Champion
2019 Shin Karate All Japan K-2 Grand Prix Champion
All Japan Glove Karate Federation
2017 All Japan Glove Karate Federation Osaka -55kg Champion
2016 All Japan Glove Karate Federation Junior Highschool Lightweight Champion
2017 All Japan Glove Karate Federation -55kg Champion
Green Boy Fight
2016 Green Boy Fight Belt Tournament Welterweight Champion

Fight record

|-  style="background:#fbb;"
| 2022-12-25|| Loss ||align=left| Koyata Yamada || RISE WORLD SERIES / SHOOTBOXING-KINGS|| Tokyo, Japan || KO (Right cross) || 2 || 1:21

|-  style="background:#cfc;"
| 2022-10-30 ||Win||align=left| Hyuga || RISE 162 || Tokyo, Japan|| Decision (Unanimous) || 3 || 3:00 
|-

|-  style="background:#cfc;"
| 2021-09-23|| Win||align=left| Kyosuke || RISE WORLD SERIES 2021 Yokohama || Yokohama, Japan || Decision (Unanimous)||3  ||3:00

|-  style="text-align:center; background:#fbb;"
| 2021-07-04|| Loss ||align=left| Ryoga Terayama || Shooto 2021 Vol.4 - Cage Kick Championship, Final  || Osaka, Japan || Ext.R Decision (Split) || 4 || 3:00
|-
! style=background:white colspan=9 |

|-  style="text-align:center; background:#cfc;"
| 2021-07-04|| Win ||align=left| Takuro || Shooto 2021 Vol.4 - Cage Kick Championship, Semi Final  || Osaka, Japan || Decision (Unanimous) || 3 ||3:00

|-  style="text-align:center; background:#cfc;"
| 2021-07-04|| Win ||align=left| Ryunosuke Omori || Shooto 2021 Vol.4 - Cage Kick Championship, Quarter Final  || Osaka, Japan || Decision (Unanimous) ||3  ||3:00 

|-  style="text-align:center; background:#cfc;"
| 2021-02-22|| Win ||align=left| Yu Hiramatsu || ROAD to ONE 4th: Young Guns  || Tokyo, Japan || KO (3 Knockdowns/Spinning back fist)|| 2 || 2:25

|-  style="text-align:center; background:#cfc;"
| 2020-12-20|| Win ||align=left| Keito Naito || Shooto 2020 vol.8 || Osaka, Japan || Decision (Majority) || 3||3:00 

|-  style="text-align:center; background:#cfc;"
| 2020-11-01 || Win ||align=left| Ryoga Terayama || RISE Dead or Alive Osaka || Osaka, Japan || Decision (Majority) || 3||3:00 

|-  style="text-align:center; background:#cfc;"
| 2020-09-10|| Win ||align=left| Naoya Kuroda || ROAD to ONE 3rd: Tokyo Fight Night || Tokyo, Japan || KO (Knee to the Body) || 2 || 2:22

|-  style="text-align:center; background:#cfc;"
| 2020-07-12|| Win || align=left| Tatsuma Kinosada || Shooto 2020 Vol.4 in Osaka|| Osaka, Japan || Decision (Unanimous)  ||3 || 3:00

|-  style="text-align:center; background:#c5d2ea;"
| 2019-12-22|| Draw|| align=left| Ryoga Terayama || Stand up Kickboxing Vol.1 || Tokyo, Japan || Decision (Unanimous) ||3 || 3:00

|-  style="text-align:center; background:#cfc;"
| 2019-10-05|| Win || align=left| Lehe || ONE Warrior Series 8|| Tokyo, Japan || TKO (Doctor Stoppage) ||3 ||1:54

|-  style="text-align:center; background:#cfc;"
| 2019-07-21|| Win || align=left| Yuki Hamada || RISE WORLD SERIES 2019 Semi Final Round|| Osaka, Japan || Decision (Unanimous)  ||3 || 3:00

|-
| colspan=9 | Legend:    

|-  style="text-align:center; background:#cfc;"
| 2019-02-24|| Win || align=left| Ryuki Yoshii || NJKF 2019 west 1st|| Osaka, Japan || Decision (Unanimous) ||3 ||2:00

|-  style="text-align:center; background:#cfc;"
| 2018-10-21|| Win || align=left| Ryoma Matsuzaki || Amateur Dageki Kakutougi Japan Cup 2018, Final || Tokyo, Japan || Decision (Split) || 2 || 2:00 
|-
! style=background:white colspan=9 |

|-  style="text-align:center; background:#cfc;"
| 2018-10-21|| Win || align=left| Kazuya Kato || Amateur Dageki Kakutougi Japan Cup 2018, Semi Final || Tokyo, Japan ||  ||  ||  

|-  style="text-align:center; background:#cfc;"
| 2018-10-21|| Win || align=left|  || Amateur Dageki Kakutougi Japan Cup 2018, Quarter Final || Tokyo, Japan ||  ||  ||  

|-  style="text-align:center; background:#cfc;"
| 2018-05-20|| Win || align=left| Shota Tanaka || HOOST CUP KING NAGOYA 04|| Nagoya, Japan || Decision (Unanimous) ||2 ||2:00

|-  style="text-align:center; background:#cfc;"
| 2016-10-22|| Win || align=left| Ayato Kosaka || Amateur Dageki Kakutougi Japan Cup 2016, Final || Tokyo, Japan || Decision (Unanimous) || 1 || 3:00 
|-
! style=background:white colspan=9 |

|-  style="text-align:center; background:#cfc;"
| 2016-03-|| Win||align=left|   || Green Boy Fight, Final|| Kyoto, Japan || ||  ||
|-
! style=background:white colspan=9 |

|-  style="text-align:center; background:#CCFFCC;"
| 2016-03-|| Win ||align=left| Niho  || Green Boy Fight, Semi Final|| Kyoto, Japan || ||  ||

|-  bgcolor="#cfc"
| 2015-09-06 ||Win ||align=left| Makoto Nishibe ||Shoot Boxing Amateur Kansai || Osaka, Japan ||  Decision (Unanimous) || 2 ||2:00

|-  bgcolor="#cfc"
| 2015-06-07 ||Win ||align=left| Ryo Yano ||Shoot Boxing Amateur Kansai || Osaka, Japan ||  Decision (Majority) || 2 ||2:00

|-  style="text-align:center; background:#fbb;"
| 2015-03-01|| Loss || align=left| Yuushin Noguchi || HOOST CUP Spirit 5|| Kyoto, Japan || Decision (Unanimous) ||2 ||2:00

|-  bgcolor="#fbb"
| 2014-11-09|| Loss||align=left| Mau Tagawa ||Shoot Boxing Amateur Kansai || Osaka, Japan || Decision (Majority) || 2 || 2:00

|-  bgcolor="#cfc"
| 2014-06-29 ||Win ||align=left| Tomohiro Ushida||Shoot Boxing Amateur Kansai || Osaka, Japan || Decision (Unanimous) || 2 ||2:00

|-
| colspan=9 | Legend:

See also
 List of male kickboxers

References

2001 births
Living people
Japanese male kickboxers
Sportspeople from Osaka